There are 33 Grade I listed buildings in the Vale of Glamorgan all of which are churches and priory buildings, castles, country or manor houses and associated structures such as churchyard crosses and a dovecote.

The Vale of Glamorgan is a county borough in Wales. In the United Kingdom, the term listed building refers to a building or other structure officially designated as being of special architectural, historical, or cultural significance; Grade I structures are those considered to be "buildings of exceptional interest". Listing was begun by a provision in the Town and Country Planning Act 1947. Once listed, strict limitations are imposed on the modifications allowed to a building's structure or fittings. In Wales, the authority for listing under the Planning (Listed Buildings and Conservation Areas) Act 1990 rests with Cadw.

Buildings

|}

Notes

See also

 Grade II* listed buildings in the Vale of Glamorgan
 Listed buildings in the Vale of Glamorgan
 List of scheduled monuments in the Vale of Glamorgan
 Registered historic parks and gardens in the Vale of Glamorgan

References

External links

 
Vale of Glamorgan I